Swinford Glacier is a tributary glacier, 6 nautical miles (11 km) long, flowing southeast between Mount Holloway and Marshall Mountains to enter Beardmore Glacier. It was discovered by the British Antarctic Expedition (1907–09) and named by Ernest Shackleton for his eldest son, Raymond Swinford. The map of the British Antarctic Expedition (1910–13) and some subsequent maps transpose the positions of Swinford Glacier and Berwick Glacier. The latter lies 12 nautical miles (22 km) northeastward. The original application (British Antarctic Expedition, 1907–09) of Berwick Glacier is the one recommended.

Glaciers of the Ross Dependency
Shackleton Coast